Pablo Cuevas and Horacio Zeballos were the defending champions. Cuevas chose to compete in Madrid and Zeballos chose not to compete this year.Nicolas Mahut and Édouard Roger-Vasselin won in the final 5–7, 6–3, [10–7], against Karol Beck and Leoš Friedl.

Seeds

Draw

Draw

External Links
Main Draw

BNP Paribas Primrose Bordeaux - Doubles
2010 Doubles